The Virtual Reality World Tour was the seventh headlining tour by American country music singer Brad Paisley and was in support of his eighth studio album, This Is Country Music (2011). The tour began on January 12, 2012, in Grand Rapids, Michigan and ended on November 13, 2012, in Dublin, Ireland. It ranked sixteen for Billboard's Top 25 Tours of 2012.

Background
The tour was originally going to be called The Camobunga! 2012 World Tour but changed to the Virtual Reality World Tour in January 2012. The second leg of the tour was announced on March 6, 2012.

Commercial reception
The tour ranked sixteen for Billboard's Top 25 Tours of 2012, the total gross revenue was $33,794,719, a total attendance of 485,852 and thirty one sold-out shows.

Opening acts
The Band Perry  
Scotty McCreery 
Easton Corbin 
Miranda Lambert 
Chris Young 
Pistol Annies 
Jerrod Niemann 
Virtual Opry Stage:

Love and Theft
Jana Kramer
Kristen Kelly

Notes None of the opening acts performed at the music festivals

Setlist
{{hidden
| headercss = background: #ccccff; font-size: 100%; width: 59%;
| contentcss = text-align: left; font-size: 100%; width: 75%;
| header = North America
| content = 
"Camouflage"
"The World"
"Welcome to the Future"
"Ticks"
"This Is Country Music"
"Waitin' on a Woman"
"Celebrity" 
"I'm Still a Guy"
"She's Everything"
"Southern Comfort Zone"
"Online"
"Then"
"Letter to Me
"Mud on the Tires"
"Whiskey Lullaby"  (with Kimberly Perry)
"The Nervous Breakdown"
"I'm Gonna Miss Her (The Fishin' Song)"
"Remind Me" 
"Old Alabama"
"Water"
Encore
"American Saturday Night"
"Alcohol"
}}
{{hidden
| headercss = background: #ccccff; font-size: 100%; width: 59%;
| contentcss = text-align: left; font-size: 100%; width: 75%;
| header = Europe
| content = 
"Southern Comfort Zone"
"The World"
"Ticks"
"This Is Country Music"
"Waitin' on a Woman"
"Celebrity"
"Me Neither"
"I'm Still a Guy"
"She's Everything"
"Online"
"Then"
Medley
"We Danced"
"Anything Like Me"
"Ode De Toilet (The Toilet Song)"
"Mud on the Tires" 
"Whiskey Lullaby" (with Kimberly Perry) 
"Time Warp" (acoustic)
"I'm Gonna Miss Her (The Fishin' Song)" 
"Old Alabama" 
"Water" 
"Welcome to the Future" 
Encore
"American Saturday Night"
"Alcohol"
}}

Tour dates

Festivals and other miscellaneous performances
This concert is a part of Country USA Festival.
This concert is a part of the Chippewa Valley Country Festival.
This concert is a part of the Calgary Stampede.
This concert is a part of the Craven Country Jamboree.
This concert is a part of the Red Sky Music Festival.

References

External links

2012 concert tours
Brad Paisley concert tours